Sphecosoma abnormis is a moth in the subfamily Arctiinae. It was described by George Hampson in 1898. It is found in the lower Amazon region.

Lepidoptera and Some Other Life Forms has this as a synonym of Abnormipterus abnormis.

References

Moths described in 1898
Sphecosoma